Geneseo is a city in Rice County, Kansas, United States.  As of the 2020 census, the population of the city was 236.

History
For millennia, the land now known as Kansas was inhabited by Native Americans.  In 1803, most of modern Kansas was secured by the United States as part of the Louisiana Purchase.  In 1854, the Kansas Territory was organized, then in 1861 Kansas became the 34th U.S. state.  In 1867, Rice County was founded.

Geneseo was founded in 1886. It was named after Geneseo, Illinois.

Geography

Climate
The climate in this area is characterized by hot, humid summers and generally mild to cool winters.  According to the Köppen Climate Classification system, Geneseo has a humid subtropical climate, abbreviated "Cfa" on climate maps.

Demographics

2010 census
As of the census of 2010, there were 267 people, 129 households, and 73 families residing in the city. The racial makeup of the city was 95.9% White, 0.7% from other races, and 3.4% from two or more races. Hispanic or Latino of any race were 4.1% of the population.

There were 129 households, of which 16.3% had children under the age of 18 living with them, 42.6% were married couples living together, 8.5% had a female householder with no husband present, 5.4% had a male householder with no wife present, and 43.4% were non-families. 39.5% of all households were made up of individuals, and 13.9% had someone living alone who was 65 years of age or older. The average household size was 2.07 and the average family size was 2.70.

The median age in the city was 52.8 years. 17.6% of residents were under the age of 18; 4.6% were between the ages of 18 and 24; 16.8% were from 25 to 44; 39.7% were from 45 to 64; and 21.3% were 65 years of age or older. The gender makeup of the city was 57.3% male and 42.7% female.

2000 census
As of the census of 2000, there were 272 people, 136 households, and 81 families residing in the city. The racial makeup of the city was 97.79% White, 0.37% African American, 0.74% Native American, 0.74% Asian, and 0.37% from two or more races. Hispanic or Latino of any race were 0.37% of the population.

There were 136 households, out of which 21.3% had children under the age of 18 living with them, 46.3% were married couples living together, 8.8% had a female householder with no husband present, and 40.4% were non-families. 37.5% of all households were made up of individuals, and 18.4% had someone living alone who was 65 years of age or older. The average household size was 2.00 and the average family size was 2.60.

In the city, the population was spread out, with 18.4% under the age of 18, 5.9% from 18 to 24, 20.6% from 25 to 44, 29.8% from 45 to 64, and 25.4% who were 65 years of age or older. The median age was 48 years. For every 100 females, there were 107.6 males. For every 100 females age 18 and over, there were 101.8 males.

The median income for a household in the city was $20,795, and the median income for a family was $29,250. Males had a median income of $27,083 versus $20,000 for females. The per capita income for the city was $21,998. About 8.2% of families and 9.7% of the population were below the poverty line, including 7.1% of those under the age of eighteen and 5.9% of those 65 or over.

Education
The community is served by Ellsworth USD 327 public school district.  The district high school is located in Ellsworth. The Ellsworth High School mascot is Ellsworth Bearcats.

Geneseo High School was closed through school unification in 1980. The Geneseo High School mascot was Geneseo Dragons.

Media
Newspaper
The Geneseo Journal was originally called the Geneseo Herald from 1887 to 1899, then it became Geneseo Post from 1908 to 1909. From 1979 through 1983 it was known as Geneseo Galaxy.

Notable people
 John S. Gibson, Jr. - One of the nation's youngest mayors who later moved to California and became a member of the Los Angeles City Council

See also
 National Register of Historic Places listings in Rice County, Kansas

References

Further reading

External links

 Geneseo - Directory of Public Officials
 Geneseo city map, KDOT

Cities in Kansas
Cities in Rice County, Kansas